The Wagon and the Star (or Waggon with 2x g) is a 1936 New Zealand film by producer and director J.J.W. Pollard, who also wrote the screenplay. Only one reel of the film and some out-takes survive. The handbuilt camera used was built by Ted Coubray and "confiscated" by Alexander Markey on the set of Hei Tiki.

Premise 
Two migrants from "Home" John Hawthron and Andrew Henderson from Scotland meet on a road building gang.  John has not yet made his fortune in the new country, but he eventually builds up a large transport and accommodation business and marries Mary the daughter of a local landowner, despite the presence of a villainous local lawyer.

Cast 
Most of the cast were amateurs from the local operatic society in Invercargill. 
John Peake as John Hawthron
Faye Hinchley as Mary Tyson 
William (Bill) Buchanan as Andrew Henderson 
TR Vanity ( Tom Pryde ) as Hubert Throstle

References
New Zealand Film 1912-1996 by Helen Martin & Sam Edwards p48 (1997, Oxford University Press, Auckland)

External links
 The Wagon and the Star at Nga Taonga (with video extract)  

1936 films
1930s New Zealand films
New Zealand drama films
Films set in New Zealand
1936 drama films
Films shot in New Zealand
1930s English-language films